Typha tichomirovii is a plant species native to the Astrakhan Oblast in the southern part of European Russia. The species grows in freshwater marshes and along the banks of streams and lakes. The delta of the Volga River lies within Astrakhan.

References

tichomirovii
Freshwater plants
Endemic flora of Russia
Flora of South European Russia
Plants described in 2002